Mark S. Hubbard (born October 15, 1966) is an American gospel musician. He started his music career, in 1992, with the release of Trust in Jesus by Tyscot Records. This was his only album to chart on the Billboard magazine Gospel Albums chart. The next two albums, No, I Won't Turn Back in 1995 and He's up There in 1996, were released by Tyscot Records. The 1998 release, Different Level, was released by Platinum Entertainment, and his fifth album,  Blessin' Waitin' on Me, was released by Utopia Music Group. His backing choir was called, The United Voices for Christ, now affectionately known as "The Voices".

To round out Mark Hubbard's music credentials, in 2017 Mark was elected as President Of the Chicago Chapter of The Recording Academy "The GRAMMYs.”

Early life
Hubbard was born on October 15, 1966 in Chicago, Illinois as Mark S. Hubbard, and his mother was Bishop Louarraire at Greater Temple Missionary Baptist Church. He became a believer in Jesus Christ at the age of five, and joined his mothers church, where he eventually lead the choir. His choir, The United Voices for Christ, was created in 1985, and it first had three participants, yet swelled to over one hundred.

Music career
His music recording career began in 1992, with the release of Trust in Jesus by Tyscot Records on September 25, 1992, and this was his only album that chart upon the Billboard magazine Top Gospel Albums chart at No. 28. The next two releases were released by Tyscot Records, on March 21, 1995, with No, I Won't Turn Back and October 22, 1996 release of He's up There. He would go on to release two more albums on August 18, 1998, Different Level, with Platinum Entertainment, and October 12, 2004 release of Blessin' Waitin' on Me with Utopia Music Group which awarded him his first stellar award in 2006.

Personal life
Hubbard resides in Chicago, Illinois, where he attends church at New Life Covenant Church, Pastor John Hannah.

Discography

References

1966 births
Living people
African-American songwriters
African-American Christians
Musicians from Chicago
Songwriters from Illinois
21st-century African-American people
20th-century African-American people